In enzymology, a methylmalonate-semialdehyde dehydrogenase (acylating) is an enzyme that catalyzes the chemical reaction

2-methyl-3-oxopropanoate + CoA + H2O + NAD+  propanoyl-CoA + HCO3- + NADH

The 4 substrates of this enzyme are 2-methyl-3-oxopropanoate, CoA, H2O, and NAD+, whereas its 3 products are propanoyl-CoA, HCO3-, and NADH.

This enzyme belongs to the family of oxidoreductases, specifically those acting on the aldehyde or oxo group of donor with NAD+ or NADP+ as acceptor.  The systematic name of this enzyme class is 2-methyl-3-oxopropanoate:NAD+ 3-oxidoreductase (CoA-propanoylating). Other names in common use include MSDH, and MMSA dehydrogenase.  This enzyme participates in 3 metabolic pathways: inositol metabolism, valine, leucine and isoleucine degradation, and propanoate metabolism.

Structural studies

As of late 2007, only one structure has been solved for this class of enzymes, with the PDB accession code .

References

 
 
 

EC 1.2.1
NADH-dependent enzymes
Enzymes of known structure